SpectraLayers is a digital audio editing software suite published by Steinberg Media Technologies GmbH. It is designed for audio spectrum editing, catering to professional and semi-professional users. It was originally published by Sony Creative Software under the name Sony SpectraLayers, until most of their products were acquired by MAGIX on 24 May 2016. Then in 2019, the software was acquired by Steinberg.

Overview 
SpectraLayers is an advanced audio spectrum editor which allows extraction of sounds, audio restoration and creative sound design through the use of a spectral view. Its interface is similar to an image editor.

History 
SpectraLayers was developed by Divide Frame and published by Sony as SpectraLayers Pro in July 2012. 

SpectraLayers Pro 2, released in July 2013, improved speed and added features like Spectral Casting/Molding, markers and metadata support, and non-linear scales. 

SpectraLayers Pro 3, released in January 2015 further improved performance, also adding 24-bit/192kHz audio support, and redesigning many UI components. 

December 2016 saw the release of SpectraLayers Pro 4, which is the first update released by Magix Software GmbH after its acquisition of SpectraLayers. Up until this point it had been designed and written entirely by Robin Lobel  but in 2017, Dr. Bill Evans made additional contributions to the features design and user interface. 

SpectraLayers Pro 5 was released in May 2018. The new features include a reworked GUI, HD spectrogram, Heal Action and Frequency Repair tool. 

SpectraLayers Pro 6 was released by Steinberg in July 2019. 

SpectraLayers Pro 7 introduced processes based on artificial intelligence algorithms.

SpectraLayers Pro 8 was released in June 2021. The new key features were Smarter AI, De-Bleed process, AI Reverb Reduction, EQ Matching and  Ambience Matching.

See also 
 Comparison of digital audio editors

References

External links 
 Steinberg - SpectraLayers page
 MAGIX - SpectraLayers page
 Divide Frame - SpectraLayers page

Digital audio workstation software
Soundtrack creation software
Magix software